Associação Académico 83 do Porto Inglês (Capeverdean Crioulo, ALUPEC or ALUPEK: Akadémiku 83) is a football (soccer) club that plays in the Maio Island League in Cape Verde. It is based in the city of Porto Inglês, island of Maio. Its current president is Edvaldo Soares and its coach is Nando (Fernando Graça). Since the implementation of the Second Division in 2015, Académico 83 are now the five unrelegated clubs of the island.

Académico 83 is the most successful football (soccer) club on Maio having won about 16 official regional titles, of which are nine championship titles, three cup and super cup titles and an opening tournament title. Its regional totals are now shared with Onze Unidos since April 29 after that club's cup win.  It was once shared earlier with that club even in mid to late 2016.

History

The team got its name by the fact of being formed by high school students in 1983. Its founders were Jacinto Spencer dos Santos, Domingos Emanuel Soares, Francisco Adriano Contina Inês, Mario Anibal Costa, Nelson dos Santos and Domingos Lopes Correia.  The club is an affiliate to Académica de Coimbra in Portugal.  It is one of several regional championships that has more than an affiliate of another club in Cape Verde, the other is Académica da Calheta further north on the island.

The club became a registered club in 1987. The club started to play in regional competitions in 1991 when the Maio Island League was founded and was the first club to win a regional title and was the first club from the island to compete at the national level. In 1992, its totals were shared with Onze Unidos. The club celebrated its 10th anniversary of foundation in 1993.  Two consecutive titles for the club were won in 1994 and was mastery of Maio's regional title numbers for the next seven years. From 1992 to 1993 and again from 1996 to 1997, together with Onze Unidos were the island's only club who possessed championship titles, since 1997, the title totals is second on the island behind Onze Unidos. The club celebrated its 25th anniversary of foundation in 2008. Later, the club also won two consecutive titles in 2013 and two consecutive titles in 2016.  Also, twice that the club won all four different regional competitions in 2013 and three in 2016.  In regional cup totals, Académico 83 was the island's only club to possess more than a title until 2014 when they were shared with Académica da Calheta, for a season from 2015, it was shared with Onze Unidos.

In the 2013–14 season, the club won the first three matches before suffering their first seasonal loss to Onze Unidos on 2 February and lost the number one spot. Académico 83 defeated Académica da Calheta, at the 7th round, they made a draw with Beira-Mar, that time, the club got the final chanced to become champion, it was finally dissolved after a loss to Académica da Calheta on 23 February, the season's final match was a victory over Onze Unidos 2–1 and finished runner up to another Académica affiliate from Calheta up north.

The club also organized once the tournament of Académicas of Cape Verde won by Académica of Fogo.

Académico 83 was not as successful as last season, the 2016–17 season had a moderate success, they started fifth, their first match was a loss to Morrerense 2–1 on January 14.  A win over Académica Calheta put their position to fourth, on February 26 a draw with Onze Unidos put the club to fifth, a win over Real Marítimo at the 9th round put the club to second.  A bye week at the 11th round would formally put the club to third for the rest of the season, the last two matches of the season ended in draws, first with nothing scored with Académica da Calheta, then a goal draw with Onze Unidos on April 23. The club finished third with 20 points, Académica Calheta also shared the points total, Académico 83 conceded nine goals, four less than Académica Calheta.  The club scored 17 goals, nearly half than last season, it was ranked third and was one of three clubs who scored that many.  Also at the Maio Cup, in one of the competition, the club was kicked out from further competition after they lost to Onze Unidos in the penalty shootouts 4–3 as the match ended in a scoreless draw. From spring 2016 to 2017, the club has the most cup titles, first solely then the club now shares with the most regional cup titles with Onze Unidos.

In the 2017–18 Maio Cup, Académico 83 started first in Group A. Their first match was an 8–1 win over Figueirense which is the highest scoring match in the cup for the season. Two more successful victories were followed, a 7–0 win over Santa Clara and then an 8–1 win over Cruzeiro and had a goal total of 25 of any in the regional cup, 14 more than Barreirense, first in Group B. Académico 83 had all five wins in group stage and qualifies later in the season alongside second placed Real Marítimo. In the 2017–18 Championships, the club started first place and was their position at the fourth round, the points were shared with Morrerense, the club has 11 goals scored, two more than Morrerense.  Académico 83 lost to Barreirense 3–2 on January 28, the result was unexpected to the island's major two clubs, the club was third place with 6 rounds played. Académica 83 defeated Académica Calheta at round 7 and made two more wins with their last, a 1–6 win over Miramar and was second place with 20 points (originally first as Onze Unidos fielded an eligible player in their 7th round match with Barreirense) two less than Barreirense. At the regional cup semis, they lost 1–2 to Onze Unidos and was out from further competition. Back in the championships, they made their recent win over Marítimo and has 23 points. On March 11, a huge result where they defeated Morrerense 10–1 and became mastery of goal scoring on the island, at 35, but the club was second place with 26 points behind Barreirense. The Maio Rivalry came with a 3–2 loss and remains second, five less points than Barreirense as they remain to have a chance for another regional championship title.

Rivalry
The club's main rivalry is Onze Unidos forming the Cidade do Maio rivalry, the club's least rivalry is Académica da Calheta do Maio forming the Académica derby of Maio.

Stadium
The club plays at Estádio 20 de Janeiro, also known as Estádio Municipal do Maio, Onze Unidos, and clubs from other parts of the island play at the stadium.

Logo and uniform
Its logo color is black based on Academica Coimbra's logo but with the fort on the bottom.

Its uniform color are entirely black clothing for home games and a white T-shirt with black rims one the bottom part and the remainder black for away or alternate games.

Its uniform colors up to 2016 were black with white stripes on its sleeves during home games, for away/alternate games, it was opposite with white and orange T-shirt with black stripes on its sleeves, orange socks and black shorts.

Honours

Football (soccer)
Maio Island League: 9
1991, 1993, 1994, 1998, 2012, 2013, 2015, 2016, 2019
Djarmai Cup (Maio Cup): 3
2011, 2013, 2016
Maio Opening Tournament: 2
2013
2019
Maio Super Cup: 4
2013, 2014, 2016, 2019
 Maio Champion's Cup: 1
2019/20

Youth competitions: 4
Maio U-17: 3
2013, 2014, 2015
Djarmai Cup (Maio Cup) U-17: 1
2014

Other sports
Handball:
Maio Island League (twice championship)

League and cup history

National level

Island/Regional championship

Statistics
Best position at a cup competition: 1st (national)
Appearances in a regional cup competition: 8
Appearances at regional super cup competition: 2
Highest number of points in a season: 6 (national)
Lowest number of points in a season: 4 (national)
Highest number of goals conceded in a season: 13 (national)
Highest number of matches lost in a season: 3 (national), 2011

Current technical staff

Current Under-17 technical staff

Club officials
As of December 10, 2015

Directive Board
 President: Edvaldo Silva Soares
 Vice-President: Emanuel Querido
 Secretary:  Dora Monteiro
 Vowels: Fernando Jorge da Graça, Braselina de Melo, Josemar Martins,  Evelina Soares

General Assembly
 President: Domingos Emanuel Soares
 Vice-President: Francisco Contina Inês
 Secretary: Armandina Livramento
 Vowels: José Carlos Silva, Franklin Ribeiro dos Santos

Advisory Council
 President: Nelson dos Santos
 Vice-President: Emanuel Silva Soares
 Secretary: José Maria Lopes Moreira
 Vowels: Domingos Lopes Correia, Luis Miranda (Deceased)

Gallery

Other sports

Futsal team
Considered the best team of Futsal in the past

References

External links

Official website
Soccerway
Académico 83 at Facebook 
Club profile at the Final Ball
 Académico 83 at Sports Mídia 

 
Football clubs in Cape Verde
Futsal in Cape Verde
Maio Island League
1983 establishments in Cape Verde